Lazarević is a South Slavic surname derived from a masculine given name Lazar. It may refer to:

Branko Lazarević (born 1984), Serbian football player
Dejan Lazarević (footballer) (born 1990), Slovenian professional football player
Laza Lazarević (1851–1891), Serbian writer and psychiatrist
Lazar Lazarević (1838–1919), Croatian Catholic priest
Marina Lazarević (born 1980), Serbian actress
 Milan Lazarević (handballer) (born 1948), Yugoslav handball player
 Milan Lazarević (footballer) (born 1997), Serbian footballer
Milunka Lazarević (born 1932), Serbian chess player and journalist
Mladen Lazarević (born 1984), Serbian football defender currently playing for KV Kortrijk
Nina Linta Lazarević (born 1976), Serbian actress
Stefan Lazarević (1374–1427), Serbian Despot
Vojin Lazarević (born 1942), Yugoslav striker who played for SFR Yugoslavia
Vuk Lazarević (1380–1410), the younger son of Tsar Lazar

See also 

Despot Stefan Lazarević Memorial, located in the village of Crkvine by Mladenovac, Serbia
Lazarević dynasty (1371–1427), noble Serbian medieval dynasty

Serbian surnames
Patronymic surnames
Surnames from given names